Walking Timebombs is the eponymously titled debut album of Walking Timebombs, released on August 26, 1997 through Charnel Music.

Track listing

Personnel 
Scott Ayers – tape, production, engineering, recording
Frank Garymartin – drums
Tim Thomson – cover art

References 

1997 debut albums
Charnel Music albums
Walking Timebombs albums
Albums produced by Scott Ayers